Tanglewood Music and Arts Festival was an annual two-day music, comedy and arts event held within the grounds of Narrow Water Castle, County Down, Northern Ireland. The festival, founded in 2011, has attracted significant attention both within the local area and around Northern Ireland with buses coming from as far as Belfast to the event. For the 2011 and 2012 festivals Tanglewood was held on one day; however for 2013 and 2014 it expanded into a two-day camping festival.

Facilities
Tanglewood consists of four music and arts stages. Other facilities include toilet areas, food and refreshment vans, bars and as of 2013 a camping site. From 2013 the four music and art stages have been called:

Main Stage
The Spirit Store Boat Stage
The Gramophone Acoustic and ComedyTent 
The Riff Raff Dance Tent

2011 Festival
The first Tanglewood festival took place on Saturday 6 August 2011. The lineup included popular local acts The Genuine Articles, Pearl Jem, A Plastic Rose, Identity Parade and many others.

2012 Festival
The first Tanglewood festival took place on Saturday 4 August 2012. The festival grounds expanded around the area of Narrow Water Castle due to popularity. The lineup included more popular local acts while also attracting more famous acts such as Aslan.

2013 Festival
The 2013 festival was confirmed by Tanglewood towards the end of 2012. In early 2013 the organizers confirmed that early bird tickets would be available for the first time, which include the option to camp within the festival site, another first.

2014 Festival
Tanglewood was once again a two day camping festival in 2014. 2014 was to date the last year the festival was held.

References

Music festivals in Northern Ireland